Carmen Amaya Amaya (2 November 1913/1915 – 19 November 1963) was a Spanish Romani flamenco dancer and singer, born in the Somorrostro district of Barcelona, Catalonia, Spain.

She has been called "the greatest Flamenco dancer ever  and "the most extraordinary personality of all time in flamenco dance."  She was the first female flamenco dancer to master footwork previously reserved for the best male dancers, due to its speed and intensity. She sometimes danced in high-waisted trousers as a symbol of her strong character.

Biography
She was born to a Spanish Romani family, to José Amaya Amaya (aka "El Chino", "The Chinaman"), a guitar player, and Micaela Amaya Moreno. Carmen was the second of eleven children, although only six (three sisters and two brothers) survived to adulthood.

Her date of birth is disputed. Montse Madridejos and David Pérez Merinero name 1918 as her year of birth. They cite Barcelona's inhabitants list of 1930, in which a family Amalla with a 12-year-old daughter Carmen is mentioned. They claim that no birth document is available and the document of baptism was lost due to a church fire. Furthermore, a 1920 oil painting by Julio Moisés named Maternidad shows a mother with a 2-3 year old girl, supposed to be Carmen with her mother Micaela. According to them, photographs showing Carmen Amaya as a teenager also support 1918 as the year of birth. According to Montse Madridejos, professor of Music History at the University of Barcelona and a flamenco history researcher, who specializes in Carmen Amaya, her ethnicity could have also been a factor in the birth date ambiguity: “At that time, a gypsy was neither baptized, nor registered”.

However José Luis Navarro García, cátedra de flamencología, as well as most other sources name 2 November 1913. This version is supported by the fact that in 1923 Carmen Amaya performed in a club in Madrid, which would be unlikely for a 5-year-old child, and a quote by Carmen Amaya herself in which she refers to her performance at the 1929 world exhibition:«... en la Exposición de Barcelona de 1929, yo tenía dieciseis años ...»"... at the Barcelona exhibition in 1929, when I was sixteen years old ... "

Her death certificate names 1 November 1915 as date of birth, however, perhaps splitting the difference as does the Library of Congress.

Amaya entered the flamenco world accompanied by her father, an impoverished Calé Romani guitarist who made a living by playing in pubs day and night. When Carmen was a child, she started going out with her father at night. He accompanied her on the guitar while she performed. Afterwards, they begged and picked the small change that the public threw on the floor. Soon earned her first nickname, "La Capitana".

At the same time, she started to appear in some lesser known theaters. It was only after Josep Santpere, a bright variety show businessman, showed for the first time his interest in Carmen and introduced her to more prestigious venues, that she made her debut at the Spanish Theatre in Barcelona. Soon after, she was performing at the Palace Theatre in Paris.

The first time her name appeared in print was during the International Fair of Barcelona in 1929 thanks to Sebastià Gasch, an art critic who saw her and wrote an article in the weekly newspaper . Sebastian Gash wrote:Suddenly a jump! And the gypsy girl danced. Indescribable. Soul. Pure Soul. Feeling made flesh. The floorboards vibrated with unprecedented brutality and incredible precision. La Capitana was a gross product of Nature. Like all gypsies, She must have been born dancing. It was before school, before the academy. All that she knows, She must have known from birth. Promptly, the viewer feels subjugated, upset, dominated by the face of La Capitana, by her fierce hip movements, by the bravery of her pirouettes and the force of her broken turns, whose animal ardor ran parallel with the astonishing accuracy with which she executed them. The raging battery of her heels and the unsteady play of her arms now aroused, excited, then collapsing, surrendered, abandoned, dead, gently moved by the shoulders, are still recorded in our memories like indelible plaques. what caused us to look at her dance was her nerve, which twisted her in dramatic contortions, her blood, her violence, her wild impetuosity as a caste dancer.

At this point Vicente Escudero, a respected businessman, saw her dancing and concluded that Carmen would bring about a flamenco revolution thanks to her perfect synthesis of two important styles: that of the traditional dancers, and the looming style of dancers in the varieties.

In 1930, she was part of the Manuel Vallejo company, performing all over Spain. On her return to Barcelona she danced at the Teatro Español, recommended by José Cepero.

In 1929, she appeared in the tablao Villa Rosa poster in Madrid and in 1930, she performed at the International Exhibition.

That year she worked in the Zarzuela Theatre, also known as the Coliseum, in Madrid with Conchita Piquer, Miguel de Molina, and other famous artists, and at the Fontalba Theatre. That was the authentic success of Carmen nationwide. She played a small role in La hija de Juan Simón and Maria de la O, and worked for a musical magazine in Barcelona. From her first performance” in 1935 to her last one in “Los Tarantos”, her dancing showcases the purest form of flamenco. The films she starred in are remarkable in that very few films have been created around one figure. They are also a model for all dancers who define their dance as being “of temperament”. Very seldom in the history of New York have dance and flamenco been as successful as Carmen Amaya's performances.

Juan Carceller hired her for a tour. She travelled to several big cities, including San Sebastián. In 1935, Luisita Esteo presented her in Madrid, in a show at the Coliseum. On 18th July 1936, when the coup in Spain took place, Carmen and her team were in the Zorrilla Theatre in Valladolid, working for Carcellé's company. At that time, they were financially secure and she had bought her first car. They were due to go to Lisbon to sign the lease, but the car was requisitioned and they could not travel to Portugal until November.

In 1952, she married guitarist Juan Antonio Agüero, a member of her troupe, coming from a distinguished family from Santander, who was not a gypsy. They lived an authentic love story and celebrated an intimate wedding. In 1959, Carmen experienced one of the most exciting moments of her life, when the inauguration ceremony of a fountain bearing her name was held. The fountain was placed on the Paseo Marítimo de Barcelona, which crosses the neighbourhood of Somorrostro, the same places where she had walked by many years before as a child, barefoot and dragging her misery.

In 1988, as an homage to Carmen Amaya, the Tablao de Carmen was founded in the Poble Espanyol, the very place where she danced for the King of Spain Alfonso XIII during the inauguration of the 1929 Barcelona International Exposition. Tablao de Carmen displays some of the photographic legacy of Carmen Amaya. The guitar of her husband Juan Antonio Agüero (by Santos Hernández 1930) is a part of the patrimony of the founder family of Tablao de Carmen and it is played in the Tablao on special occasions.

Beginning of international success: South America and Central America (1936–1940)
In 1936, when the Spanish Civil War had just begun, Carmen Amaya and her troupe were on tour in Valladolid with Luisita Esteso's show. They crossed the border from Spain to Portugal and, after a short time arrived in Lisbon. From there they sailed for Buenos Aires on the ship Monte Pascoal, which took fifteen days to cross the Atlantic and arrive at Brazil and Uruguay. She debuted in Buenos Aires, accompanied by Ramón Montoya and Sabicas at the Maravillas Theatre.

During this stage of her life, she added to her artistic group several members of her family. She made films in Buenos Aires with Miguel de Molina and won the admiration of musicians Arturo Toscanini and Leopold Stokowski, who publicly praised her.

The success of Carmen Amaya and her family exceeded all expectations. They planned to stay for only four weeks but ended up staying there for nine months, since every time Carmen performed, the theater was filled and tickets were sold out two months in advance. A good example of the enormous popularity that the artist achieved in this South American country is the construction of a theater that bears her name: el Teatro Amaya.

In addition, it seems that during most of those years in America the bailaora maintained a personal relationship with Sabicas, who declared shortly before his death that he and Carmen had been dating for nine years, and that they had split in Mexico.

Consolidation in the United States (1941–1947)
In the US, Carmen Amaya met many of the most influential people of her time. She went several times to Hollywood to film some movies and the most important personalities of cinema, music or culture wanted to see her dance. The musician Toscanini saw one of her performances once and declared that he had never seen an artist with more rhythm and more fire. She improvised continuously, as quickly as perfectly.

She traveled to New York in 1941 and performed at Carnegie Hall with Sabicas and Antonio de Triana. Whilst in the United States, she also met Franklin Roosevelt, President of the United States. It was reported that after seeing her, Roosevelt gave her a bowling jacket with brilliants and invited her to dance at the White House. She returned to Europe where she performed at the Théâtre des Champs-Élysées in Paris and later in London, where she got to meet the Queen of the United Kingdom.

Return to Spain
When Carmen Amaya returned to Spain in 1947, she was already a world-famous figure. In the years spent in America she not only professionally established herself as an artist, but also became, inevitably, a legend. By then, her dance was the most daring flamenco ever performed in a theater. However, she did not stand out only for her art but also for her fascinating personality, which won over everyone she knew, both because of her dancing and her unpredictable behaviour. She also was extraordinarily generous.

She was a great success at the London Princess Theatre in 1948, and also on her next American tour. She toured Argentina again in 1950.

She returned to dance in Spain the following year, performing at the Tivoli theatro in Barcelona after several performances in Rome. She continued her work in Madrid, Paris, London, and different cities in Germany, Italy, and the rest of Europe. The Queen of England congratulated her when she performed there; Carmen Amaya and Elizabeth II appeared together in a newspaper photograph entitled: "Two queens face to face."
 
In subsequent years she continued her work in northern Europe, France, Spain, the United States, Mexico and South America.
She triumphed at the Westminster Theatre in London and at La Zarzuela theatre in Madrid in 1959. At that time, Barcelona paid tribute to Carmen Amaya by building the Carmen Fountain in the artist's old home district, Somorrostro, to popular acclaim.
She recorded her last film, Los Tarantos, by Rovira-Beleta in 1963, and afterwards continued working. At the end, her illness prevented her from continuing in Gandía.

Her illness was exacerbated by the filming of her latest film, Los Tarantos, directed by Rovira-Beleta (1963). Carmen overcame her health issues and at the end of filming started a summer tour. The last time she performed in Madrid, she was already terminally ill. Finally, her illness stopped her from performing, a kind of renal impairment that impeded her properly eliminating the toxins that her body accumulated. The doctors could not find a suitable treatment. She danced for the last time in Malaga. On August 8, 1963, whilst she was working in Gandía, Carmen interrupted her performance. She was dancing when suddenly she said to Batista: "Andrés, we finished."

Death
Carmen Amaya died of kidney disease in Begur, Girona, northeast Catalonia, in 1963 and is buried at the Cemetery of Ciriego in Santander.

She was awarded the Medal of Merit of Tourism in Barcelona, the Lasso of the Lady of the Order of Isabel la Católica award, and given the title of Adoptive Daughter of Begur.

Three years after her death (1966) she was honored by a monument placed in the Amusement Park of Montjuic. Buenos Aires has a street named after her. In Madrid in the "Tablao" Los Califas, she was honored by a tribute performance in which many artists participated, including Lucero Tena, Mariquilla, and Felix de Utrera.

Medals and recognition awards 
Her death was a great loss for the entire Flamenco world. She was awarded with the Medalla del Mérito Turístico de Barcelona, Lazo de Isabel la Católica and the title of Hija Adoptiva de Bagur. Her funeral summoned a large number of Roma People from different parts of Spain and even France.

Amaya died in Bagur, where she spent her last days, her remains rest in the crypt of her husband's family, in Santander. Three years after her death in 1966, the statues of her were erected in the Parque de Montjuic in Barcelona, and in Buenos Aires, while in Madrid, in Tablao Los Califas, a tribute, led by Lucero Tena, among other artists, took place.  She was also honored in Llafranch (Girona) in 1970.

The personality of Carmen Amaya has been celebrated by critics, flamencologists and writers, as well as by poets, including Fernando Quiñones, author of the poem Soneto y letras en vivo para Car men Amaya. A selected transcription of these comments by Vicente Marrero, reads:

Carmen Amaya can see the amazing conviction that sometimes tends to dance. "Gitanilla" ungainly, skinny, petite, almost disembodied. Brunette, with a tragic and remote idol face, Asian cheekbones, with long eyes full of omens, twisted arms. With her "repajolera" gypsy [Romani] grace, she is not just another millionaire in North America, but one of our great dancers, who has succeeded, with the secret of dance and her dance she was born  to dance, and she danced  phenomenally. Carmen Amaya, is her name, is not a different woman in each of her dances, as so often happens with other great dance figures.

Carmen's flamenco legacy is still valid to this day as an example of dancing with force, meter, intensity and power and a way of expression which brought an end to the sweetness of flamenco which had endured until that point. The famous producer Sol Hurok described Carmen as “The Human Vesuvius.” Carmen Amaya has been the incarnation of the flamenco dance par excellence. She has danced in numerous films.

Selected filmography
 1929 - La bodega (Wine Cellars)
 1934 - 2 mujeres y 1 Don Juan
 1935 - La hija de Juan Simón
 1935 - Don Viudo de Rodríguez
 1936 - María de la O
 1939 - Embrujo del Fandango (Cuba)
 1941 - Original Gypsy dances
 1942 - Aires de Andalucía
 1942 - Panama Hattie
 1944 - Knickerbocker Holiday (Pierna de Plata)
 1944 - Follow the Boys (Sueños de Gloria)
 1945 - Los amores de un torero (México)
 1945 - See My Lawyer (Entiéndase con mi abogado)
 1953 - Quand te tues-tu?
 1954 - Dringue, Castrito y la lámpara de Aladino
 1955 - Música en la Noche
 1963 - Los Tarantos

References

Bibliography
 
 Bois, Mario (1994). Carmen Amaya o la danza del fuego. Madrid: Espasa Calpe.
 Hidalgo Gómez, Francisco (2010). Carmen Amaya. La biografía. Barcelona: Ediciones Carena.
 Madridejos Mora, Montserrat (2012). El flamenco en la Barcelona de la Exposición Internacional (1929-1930). Barcelona: Edicions Bellaterra.
 Madridejos Mora, Montserrat y David Pérez Merinero (2013), Carmen Amaya. Barcelona: Edicions Bellaterra.
 Montañés, Salvador (1963). Carmen Amaya. La bailaora genial. Barcelona: Ediciones G.P.
 Pujol Baulenas, Jordi y Carlos García de Olalla (2003). Carmen Amaya. El mar me enseñó a bailar. Barcelona: Almendra Music.
 Sevilla, Paco (1999). Queen of the gypsies. The Life and legend of Carmen Amaya. San Diego, EE.UU: Sevilla Press.
 Francisco HIdalgo Gómez (1995). Carmen Amaya: cuando duermo sueño que estoy bailando. Barcelona. Libros PM.
 Revista de l'Associació d'Investigació i Experimentació Teatral, año 2008 num 66-67

External links

 Carmen Amaya at Papelesflamencos.com
 Short biography of Carmen Amaya at Historiasdeflamenco.com  
 Carmen Amaya biography and related products
 Carmen Amaya description on her grandniece's website
 "Queen of the Gypsies", a portrait of Carmen Amaya, video clips from the documentary
 Centennial special: Carmen Amaya
 El Arte de Vivir el Flamenco

1910s births
1963 deaths
Castanets players
Musicians from Catalonia
Flamenco dancers
Flamenco singers
Romani dancers
Romani singers
Spanish Romani people
20th-century Spanish singers
20th-century Spanish women singers
Year of birth uncertain
Burials at Ciriego Cemetery